Quinn David Mack (born September 11, 1965) is an American former professional baseball outfielder. He spent part of one season in Major League Baseball, appearing in five games for the Seattle Mariners in 1994.

Mack's five major league games all came between June 16 and June 21, 1994. In his major league debut, Mack batted five times and got three hits, including two doubles. In the next four games, however, Mack got two hits in sixteen at bats, finishing with a .238 career batting average.

Mack is the younger brother of fellow MLB outfielder Shane Mack.

References

External links

Mack's minor league statistics at The Baseball Cube

1965 births
Living people
African-American baseball players
American expatriate baseball players in Canada
American expatriate baseball players in Mexico
Baseball players from Los Angeles
Calgary Cannons players
Burlington Expos players
Indianapolis Indians players
Jacksonville Expos players
Major League Baseball outfielders
Memphis Chicks players
Ottawa Lynx players
Petroleros de Poza Rica players
Portland Sea Dogs players
Saraperos de Saltillo players
Seattle Mariners players
Tacoma Rainiers players
Tecolotes de Nuevo Laredo players
UC Santa Barbara Gauchos baseball players
West Palm Beach Expos players
21st-century African-American people
20th-century African-American sportspeople